Cari Johnson (born February 22, 1977) is a Canadian sport shooter. She competed at the 2000 Summer Olympics in the women's 50 metre rifle three positions event, in which she placed 40th, and the women's 10 metre air rifle event, in which she placed 48th.

References

1977 births
Living people
Canadian female sport shooters
ISSF rifle shooters
Olympic shooters of Canada
People from Campbell River, British Columbia
Shooters at the 2000 Summer Olympics
Sportspeople from British Columbia
Commonwealth Games medallists in shooting
Commonwealth Games bronze medallists for Canada
Shooters at the 2002 Commonwealth Games
20th-century Canadian women
Medallists at the 2002 Commonwealth Games